Lightning Bryce is a 1919-1920 American Western film serial directed by Paul Hurst and starring Ann Little and Jack Hoxie (his first starring role). In all, 15 episodes were produced; all episodes survive today and are in the public domain.

Cast
 Ann Little as Kate Arnold
 Jack Hoxie as Sky "Lightning" Bryce
 Paul Hurst as Powder Solvang
 Jill Woodward as the Mystery Woman
 Steve Clemente as Zambleau
 Scout as Lightning's horse

Uncredited
 Yakima Canutt as the Deputy (episode 15)
 George Champion as a henchman
 Ben Corbett as a henchman
 Edna Holland as Daisy Bliss
 George Hunter as a henchman
 Noble Johnson as Dopey Sam's henchman / Arnold's butler
 Slim Lucas as a henchman
 Augustina López as Mother Lopez
 Walter Patterson as a henchman

Episode list
 "The Scarlet Moon" - October 15, 1919
 "Wolf Nights" - October 22, 1919
 "Perilous Trails" - October 29, 1919
 "The Noose" - November 5, 1919
 "The Dragon's Den" - November 12, 1919
 "Robes of Destruction" - November 19, 1919
 "Bared Fangs" - November 26, 1919
 "The Yawning Abyss" - December 3, 1919
 "The Voice of Conscience" - December 10, 1919
 "Poison Waters" - December 17, 1919
 "Walls of Flame" - December 24, 1919
 "A Voice from the Dead" - December 31, 1919
 "Battling Barriers" - January 7, 1920
 "Smothering Tides" - January 14, 1920
 "The End of the Trail" - January 21, 1920

Reception
A reviewer for Motion Picture News noted the outdoor shots, writing, "a wide variety of scenery is used as a background, much of it being really beautiful.", and continued, "Suspense is nicely maintained at the close of each episode and there are plenty of stunts pulled which are noteworthy. In these Hoxie is not alone, being ably assisted by Miss Little." A critic for Exhibitors Herald wrote, "This serial has received more favorable comments than any serial that has been run for some time. Children will like it."

References

External links

 
 

1919 films
1919 Western (genre) films
American silent serial films
Western (genre) film series
American black-and-white films
Arrow Film Corporation films
Silent American Western (genre) films
1910s American films
1920s American films